Mindishevo (Mindeş) is a rural locality (a village) in Ishimbayevsky Selsoviet, Salavatsky District, Bashkortostan, Russia. The population was 304 as of 2010. There are 6 streets.

Geography 
Mindishevo is located 39 km southwest of Maloyaz (the district's administrative centre) by road. Ishimbayevo is the nearest rural locality.

References 

Rural localities in Salavatsky District